Anindito Wahyu Erminarno (born 13 April 1988) is an Indonesian professional footballer who plays as a attacking midfielder for Liga 2 club Kalteng Putra.

Personal life
Anindito was born in Surakarta, and growing up his favorite sport was actually badminton. He joined a youth football academy with his brother at the age of eight.

International career
He played a first game with the national team in a match against Nepal, but he did not earn his first cap; the match was considered unofficial in FIFA's website. His official debut came in the next game, a 2–0 win over Malaysia on 14 September 2014, replacing Dedi Hartono after 11 minutes.

Career statistics

International

References

External links

1988 births
Living people
People from Surakarta
Javanese people
Indonesian Muslims
Converts to Islam
Indonesian footballers
Liga 1 (Indonesia) players
Indonesian Premier Division players
Persis Solo players
Persija Jakarta players
Mitra Kukar players
Association football midfielders
Sportspeople from Central Java